Bernardo Saraiva (born 6 August 1993) is a Portuguese tennis player.

Saraiva has a career-high ATP singles ranking of 694 achieved on 4 December 2017. He also has a career high doubles ranking of 243 achieved on 10 December 2018.

Saraiva has won 1 ATP Challenger doubles title at the 2019 Columbus Challenger.

Challenger and Futures finals

Singles: 2 (0–2)

Doubles: 28 (14–14)

External links
 
 

1993 births
Living people
Portuguese male tennis players
Sportspeople from Lisbon
Tennis players from San Francisco
21st-century Portuguese people